Mattias Gustafsson (born 11 July 1978) is a Swedish handball player, currently playing for Danish Handball League side FCK Håndbold, with whom he won the Danish Championship in 2008. He has previously played for IFK Skövde in the best league of his homeland.

Gustafsson has made 20 appearances for the Swedish national handball team.

External links
 player info

1978 births
Living people
Swedish male handball players
Handball players at the 2012 Summer Olympics
Olympic handball players of Sweden
Olympic silver medalists for Sweden
Olympic medalists in handball
Medalists at the 2012 Summer Olympics